Ruta, commonly known as rue, is a genus of strongly-scented evergreen subshrubs.

Ruta may also refer to:


People

Last name
Clemente Ruta (1668–1767), Italian painter 
Domenica Ruta, American author
Enrico Ruta (1869–1939), Italian philosopher, sociologist and translator
Jason Ruta (born 1979), Canadian television personality and actor
Gilda Ruta (1856–1932), Italian pianist, music educator and composer
Marcello Ruta, Italian paleontologist
Pietro Ruta (born 1987), Italian rower
Vanessa Ruta, American neurobiologist

First name
Ruta Gedmintas (born 1983), English actress
Ruta Lealamanua (born 1974), New Zealand softball player
Ruta Lee (born 1935), Canadian actress and dancer
Ruta Šaca-Marjaša (1927–2016), Jewish Latvian lawyer, writer, poet and politician
Ruta Sepetys (born 1967), Lithuanian-American writer of historical fiction

Places
Ruta, Warmian-Masurian Voivodeship, a village in Poland
Ruta, Lovrenc na Pohorju, a village in Slovenia

Fiction
Divine Beast Vah Ruta, one of the key dungeons in The Legend of Zelda: Breath of the Wild

See also
Rūta, a Lithuanian and Latvian female given name

Feminine given names